Shepenupet II (alt. Shepenwepet II, prenomen: Henutneferumut Irietre) was an ancient Egyptian princess of the 25th Dynasty who served as the high priestess, the Divine Adoratrice of Amun, from around 700 BC to 650 BC. She was the daughter of the first Kushite pharaoh Piye and sister of Piye's successors, Shabaka and Taharqa.

Biography
Shepenupet II was adopted by her predecessor in office, Amenirdis I, a sister of Piye. Shepenupet was God's Wife of Amun from the beginning of Taharqa's reign until Year 9 of Pharaoh Psamtik I. While in office she had to come to a power sharing arrangement with the mayor of Thebes, Mentuemhat.

Her niece, Amenirdis, the daughter of Taharqa, was appointed as her heiress. Shepenupet was compelled to adopt Nitocris, daughter of pharaoh Psamtik I, who reunited Egypt after the Assyrian conquest. This is evidenced by the so-called Adoption Stela of Nitocris. In 656 BC, in Year 9 of the reign of Psamtik I, she received Nitocris at Thebes.

Her tomb is located in the grounds of Medinet Habu. She was succeeded as Divine Adoratrice by Amenirdis II, who was succeeded by Nitocris I.

Images

References

God's Wives of Amun
Princesses of the Twenty-fifth Dynasty of Egypt
8th-century BC Egyptian people
7th-century BC Egyptian people
8th-century BC Egyptian women
7th-century BC Egyptian women
8th-century BC clergy
7th-century BC clergy